Henri Quintric (3 September 1897 – 10 November 1955) was a French racewalker. He competed in the men's 50 kilometres walk at the 1932 Summer Olympics.

References

1897 births
1955 deaths
Athletes (track and field) at the 1932 Summer Olympics
French male racewalkers
Olympic athletes of France
Place of birth missing